The following are the national records in Olympic weightlifting in Saudi Arabia. Records are maintained in each weight class for the snatch lift, clean and jerk lift, and the total for both lifts by the Saudi Arabian Weightlifting Federation.

Men

Women

References

Saudi Arabia
Olympic weightlifting
records
weightlifting